The 2019 Indian general election in Punjab was held on 19 May 2019, making it seventh and the last phase of the election. Counting was held on 23 May 2019 and result was also declared on same day.

Surveys

Opinion polls

Exit Polls

Coalition and Party wise Result
Keys:  
,
,
,

Constituency wise results

List of Candidates
Keys:  
,
,
,

Assembly segments wise lead of Parties

Bypolls 2019-2024

See also 

2024 Indian general election in Punjab

2022 Punjab Legislative Assembly election

2021 Punjab, India local elections

References

External links
Election Commission of India
 Punjab Lok Sabha Election 2019

2019
2010s in Punjab, India
2019 Indian general election